"Night Time Magic" is a song written and recorded by American country music artist Larry Gatlin.  It was released in April 1978 as the first single from his album Oh Brother.  The song peaked at number 2 on the Billboard Hot Country Singles chart. It also reached number 1 on the RPM Country Tracks chart in Canada.

Chart performance

References

1978 singles
1978 songs
Larry Gatlin songs
Monument Records singles
Songs written by Larry Gatlin